The $5.98 E.P. – Garage Days Re-Revisited (released on CD format as The $9.98 CD – Garage Days Re-Revisited) is the first extended play by American heavy metal band Metallica, released on August 21, 1987, by Elektra Records. It consists entirely of covers of late-'70s and early-'80s new wave of British heavy metal bands and punk rock music rehearsed in Lars Ulrich's soundproofed garage and then recorded in Los Angeles over the course of six days. It is the group's first release following the death of bassist Cliff Burton and the first to feature his successor, Jason Newsted.

Development
With Metallica scheduled to play the 1987 Monsters of Rock festival at Castle Donington, the band's UK label Vertigo Records suggested that they release new material to mark the occasion. Initial songwriting attempts with new bassist Jason Newsted resulted only in a demo for "Blackened", and vocalist/guitarist James Hetfield subsequently broke his arm skateboarding and was unable to play guitar for several weeks. Given these obstacles, the band decided to record covers of some of their favorite songs rather than work on new material. Newsted utilized his earlier experience as a construction worker to soundproof Lars Ulrich's garage in El Cerrito, California, where the band would rehearse the material prior to recording.

While rehearsing the song "White Lightning" by new wave of British heavy metal band Paralex, Kirk Hammett started playing "The Wait" by post-punk group Killing Joke, and the band subsequently decided to try recording the song. Other tracks considered but dropped include "Signal Fire" by Japanese band Bow Wow and another NWOBHM song, Gaskin's "I'm No Fool". Though "Last Caress" and "Green Hell" are combined into a single track by Metallica, the original Misfits versions were featured on different albums and were recorded five years apart.

The band included The $5.98 E.P. in the title in an effort to ensure that retailers did not overcharge fans. The original cassette release included a sticker stating "If they try to charge more, STEAL IT!" The title of the official American CD release was amended to The $9.98 CD, as the retail price of CDs was much higher than cassette; other countries (such as Australia) still displayed The $5.98 E.P. with a sticker stating that this is the "title" and not the price. "The Wait" was omitted from the UK pressings in order to conform to local music-industry rules regarding the length of EPs. 

The $5.98 E.P. – Garage Days Re-Revisited was out of print from 1989 to 2018, and the original release is considered a collector's item. All five tracks were included on the 1998 double album Garage Inc. along with other covers and new recordings. The cover of the CD also was used as a basis for the Garage Inc. back cover, which shows the original Garage Days cover with pictures of the band members' faces, circa 1998, taped over the original faces, along with Garage Inc. covering the original album name.

In 2018, The $5.98 E.P. – Garage Days Re-Revisited was reissued under Metallica's own Blackened Recordings label and also was made available in vinyl format.

Track listing

Personnel
 James Hetfield – lead vocals, rhythm guitar
 Kirk Hammett – lead guitar
 Jason Newsted  – bass guitar, backing vocals
 Lars Ulrich – drums

Production
All information derived from the liner notes.
Arranged and "not very produced" by Metallica
Engineer: Csaba Petocz; assisted by Greg Dennen and Marnie Riley
Recorded and mixed at A&M and Conway Studios
Original mastering by Ron Lewter (at The Mastering Lab)
Remastering by Chris Bellman at Bernie Grundman Mastering

Chart positions
Album

Certifications

See also
Garage Inc.
A Garage Dayz Nite

References

Metallica EPs
Covers EPs
1987 EPs
Elektra Records EPs
Vertigo Records EPs
Thrash metal EPs